Royal Victoria Park may refer to the following parks in England: 

Royal Victoria Park, Bath, Somerset
Royal Victoria Park, Bristol, see Brentry Hospital
Royal Victoria Country Park near Southampton, Hampshire